Canada Wide Media Limited is an independently owned publishing company in Western Canada, based in Burnaby, British Columbia.

History 

Canada Wide Media Limited co-founder and CEO Peter Legge purchased a ten-cent magazine in 1976 and grew it into one of Canada's most successful print and digital media companies. Canada Wide Media currently employs more than 130 media professionals and is one of the largest independently owned magazine publishing company in Western Canada.

Trivia 

Canada Wide Media Limited prints 15.5 million magazines a year and also caters to more than six million readers. It is Canada Post's third-largest client in Western Canada and produces 48 different printed and online products.

Publications

Magazines
 Alberta Golf
 Alberta Home
 AnimalSense, for the members of the British Columbia Society for the Prevention of Cruelty to Animals (BCSPCA)
 Appeal, a food and healthy lifestyle publication for customers of Save-On-Foods and Overwaitea Food Group stores across B.C. and Alberta
 Award
 Bark!, a children's magazine published by the British Columbia Society for the Prevention of Cruelty to Animals (BCSPCA)
 BC Home & Garden
 BCBusiness, British Columbia's regional business magazine
 Pacific Golf
 PeopleTalk, the member magazine of the British Columbia Human Resources Management Association (BC HRMA)
 Promise
 Soar, the in-flight magazine of Pacific Coastal Airlines
 Speaking of Children
 TVWeek, a weekly local television entertainment news and listings magazine
 Waters, the official magazine of the Vancouver Aquarium
 Well Into The Future
 Wellness Matters
 Western Living
 Westworld, the magazine of CAA clubs in British Columbia, Alberta and Saskatchewan, with regional editions for each province

eNewsletters

 BC Home eNewsletter
 BCBusiness Events eNewsletter
 BCBusiness Need to Know
 Canada Wide Contests eNewsletter
 GardenWise eNewsletter
 Granville eNewsletter
 Real Golf eNewsletter
 TVWeek Daily Updates

Directories and guides
 BC Approved Accommodation Guide, a guide for Tourism BC-approved accommodations throughout British Columbia
 BC Outdoor Adventure Guide
 BC Vacation Planner
 BCLNA Buyer's Guide
 Burnaby Board of Trade Directory, a magazine-style resource for people who are involved in the business community in Burnaby, British Columbia
 PGA of BC Directory
 Whistler Real Estate

Trade publications
 AQ
 BC Restaurant News, a publication for members of the BC Restaurant & Foodservices Association (BCRFA)
 BCB Communicator and USB Communicator
 Grocer Today, Western Canada's trade publication for the country's food producers, manufacturers, brokers, and food and drug retailers
 HortWest (BCLNA newsletter)
 Mineral Exploration Magazine, the official publication of the Association for Mineral Exploration British Columbia (AME BC)
 Truck Logger, the official publication of the Truck Loggers Association

Miscellaneous
 BC Ferries Schedule
 CanWest Show Guide

References

External links 

Magazine publishing companies of Canada
Companies based in Burnaby
Publishing companies established in 1976
1976 establishments in British Columbia